Alberto "Berto" Espeso Fernández (born 10 March 1998) is a Spanish professional footballer who plays for Córdoba CF as a left back.

Club career
Born in Oviedo, Asturias, Espeso joined Sporting de Gijón's youth setup in 2005, aged seven. On 10 January 2016, he made his senior debut with the reserves by coming on as a second-half substitute in a 1–0 away win against CP Cacereño in the Segunda División B championship; it was his maiden appearance of the campaign, which ended in relegation.

Espeso was definitely promoted to the B-team ahead of the 2017–18 season, and renewed his contract on 21 October 2017. He made his first team debut on 6 December 2018, starting in a 2–2 away draw against SD Eibar, for the season's Copa del Rey.

References

External links

1998 births
Living people
People from Oviedo
Spanish footballers
Footballers from Asturias
Association football defenders
Segunda División B players
Sporting de Gijón B players
Sporting de Gijón players
Córdoba CF players